Uroš Vitas (born 6 July 1992) is a Serbian professional footballer who plays as a defender for Serbian SuperLiga club Vojvodina.

Club career

Rad
Vitas made his senior debut with Rad in the 2010–11 season. He was named as the team's captain in early 2013, aged 20.

Gent
In January 2014, Vitas was transferred to Belgian club Gent. He made two appearances in the title-winning 2014–15 season.

Mechelen
In February 2016, Vitas switched to fellow Belgian First Division A club Mechelen.

Irtysh
On 7 February 2019, Vitas signed with Kazakh team Irtysh.

Partizan
On 11 February 2020, Vitas joined Serbian club Partizan.

Al-Qadsiah
On 23 October 2020, Vitas joined Saudi club Al-Qadsiah.

International career
Vitas represented Serbia at the 2011 UEFA European Under-19 Championship. He was also capped for Serbia at under-21 level.

Honours
Gent
Belgian Pro League: 2014–15
Belgian Super Cup: 2015

Notes

References

External links
 
 
 

Sportspeople from Niš
1992 births
Living people
Serbian footballers
Association football defenders
Serbian SuperLiga players
Belgian Pro League players
Kazakhstan Premier League players
Saudi Professional League players
Saudi First Division League players
FK Rad players
K.A.A. Gent players
K.V. Mechelen players
FC Irtysh Pavlodar players
FK Partizan players
Al-Qadsiah FC players
FK Vojvodina players
Serbia under-21 international footballers
Serbia youth international footballers
Serbian expatriate footballers
Expatriate footballers in Belgium
Serbian expatriate sportspeople in Belgium
Expatriate footballers in Saudi Arabia
Serbian expatriate sportspeople in Saudi Arabia